In number theory, the Elliott–Halberstam conjecture is a conjecture about the distribution of prime numbers in arithmetic progressions. It has many applications in sieve theory. It is named for Peter D. T. A. Elliott and Heini Halberstam, who stated the conjecture in 1968.

Stating the conjecture requires some notation. Dirichlet's theorem on primes in arithmetic progressions then tells us
that

where  is Euler's totient function.  If we then define the error function

for every  and  there exists a constant  such that

for all .

This conjecture was proven for all  by Enrico Bombieri and A. I. Vinogradov (the Bombieri–Vinogradov theorem, sometimes known simply as "Bombieri's theorem"); this result is already quite useful, being an averaged form of the generalized Riemann hypothesis. It is known that the conjecture fails at the endpoint .

The Elliott–Halberstam conjecture has several consequences.  One striking one is the result announced by Dan Goldston, János Pintz, and Cem Yıldırım, which shows (assuming this conjecture) that there are infinitely many pairs of primes which differ by at most 16. In November 2013, James Maynard showed that subject to the Elliott–Halberstam conjecture, one can show the existence of infinitely many pairs of consecutive primes that differ by at most 12. In August 2014, Polymath group showed that subject to the generalized Elliott–Halberstam conjecture, one can show the existence of infinitely many pairs of consecutive primes that differ by at most 6. Without assuming any form of the conjecture, the lowest proven bound is 246.

See also
Barban–Davenport–Halberstam theorem
Sexy prime
Siegel–Walfisz theorem

Notes

Analytic number theory
Conjectures about prime numbers
Unsolved problems in number theory